Sinocyclocheilus bicornutus is a species of ray-finned fish in the genus Sinocyclocheilus.

References 

bicornutus
Fish described in 1997